Ashok Gaikwad is an Indian film director who has directed several feature films. Most of his films have been produced by Salim Akhtar's production house Aftab Pictures. His first notable film was Qatil (1988) starring Aditya Pancholi and Sangeeta Bijlani. He was prominent in the 1990s with many Mithun Chakraborty and Jackie Shroff starrers. Some of his films are Phool Aur Angaar, Izzat, Police Officer and Krishan Avtaar.

Partial filmography

References

External links

1962 births
Living people
20th-century Indian film directors
Hindi-language film directors